William Graburn (16 March 1865 – 13 December 1944) was an English cricketer. He played two first-class matches for Surrey between 1890 and 1894.

See also
 List of Surrey County Cricket Club players

References

External links
 

1865 births
1944 deaths
English cricketers
Surrey cricketers
People from Filey
Sportspeople from Yorkshire
Hurst Park Club cricketers